The North Central Historic District in Alexander City, Alabama, in Tallapoosa County, Alabama, was listed on the National Register of Historic Places in 2005.

The district included 349 buildings deemed contributing and one contributing site, as well as 67 non-contributing buildings, in a  area roughly spanning between Hall and Summer, Warren and Hillabee, Warren and Ridgeway, MLK and Hillabee streets/avenues.

The area mainly developed from the 1880s to 1954 (50 years before NRHP nomination), with the City Cemetery (founded 1875) and the Bethel Baptist church cemetery (c.1875) preceding.

Architectural styles represented in the district include Queen Anne and Romanesque Revival.  The district includes several significant ranch-style houses designed by Auburn University professor E.W. Burkhardt and local architect Buddy Elliott.

References

External links

Historic districts on the National Register of Historic Places in Alabama
National Register of Historic Places in Tallapoosa County, Alabama
Queen Anne architecture in Alabama
Romanesque Revival architecture in Alabama